Juan Alberto Andreu Alvarado, known as Melli; born 6 June 1984), is a Spanish former footballer. A versatile defender, he could play as either a right-back or a centre-back.

He spent most of his professional career at Betis, for which he appeared in 215 competitive matches and won the 2005 Copa del Rey.

Club career

Betis
Born in Barbate, Province of Cádiz, Melli joined Real Betis as a 14-year-old, and made his way up through the ranks until he reached the reserves in 2001. He spent a short period on loan at Andalusia neighbours Polideportivo Ejido in the late stages of the 2001–02 season, in the Segunda División.

Melli scored his first professional goal through a header from a Joaquín corner kick, against CA Osasuna on 18 September 2004 (3–2 away loss). He also appeared in the UEFA Champions League and UEFA Cup during the 2005–06 campaign: in the latter tournament, he scored an essential goal at AZ Alkmaar, which allowed his team to progress to the next round; this came just one week after he put two past his own net against FC Barcelona in a La Liga match at the Camp Nou.

Melli won his first medal for Betis in the 2005 final of the Copa del Rey against Osasuna at the Vicente Calderón Stadium, on 11 June 2005, playing the full 90 minutes plus extra time in an eventual 2–1 win. He continued to be a defensive presence in the following seasons for the Verdiblancos, playing an average of 25 league games and suffering relegation in 2008–09.

Later career
In late August 2011, after another relegation, now with CD Tenerife (in the second division) whom he joined in summer 2010 – a second consecutive for the Canary Islands club – Melli moved abroad for the first time and signed a two-year contract for K.A.A. Gent from Belgium, joining compatriot César Arzo. After leaving in 2013, he represented in quick succession FC Sheriff Tiraspol, Ergotelis FC, Simurq PIK and Neftçi PFK, the latter two sides competing in the Azerbaijan Premier League.

Following his release from Neftçi on 20 June 2016, the 32-year-old Meli returned to Spain and signed a one-year contract with CF Reus Deportiu.

International career
Melli represented Spain at under-16, under-17, under-19, under-20 and under-21 levels. He made his debut for the latter on 29 April 2003 when he was 18, playing 18 minutes in a 1–0 win over Australia in Lorca, and scored his only goal in another friendly, a 3–1 defeat of Scotland on 2 September 2004.

In the run up to the 2006 FIFA World Cup, senior team manager Luis Aragonés called up Melli to a get-together, however he was ultimately not part of the squad at the finals and never earned a full cap.

Personal life
Melli's nickname stemmed from the Spanish word mellizo (twin), as he himself was a twin. His brother Víctor was also a footballer, also being nicknamed Melli. A goalkeeper, he never played in higher than Segunda División B during his career.

Club statistics

Honours
Betis
Copa del Rey: 2004–05

Sheriff	
Moldovan National Division: 2013–14

Spain U16
UEFA European Under-16 Championship: 2001

Spain U19
UEFA European Under-19 Championship: 2002

Spain U20
FIFA U-20 World Cup runner-up: 2003

References

External links

1984 births
Living people
People from Barbate
Sportspeople from the Province of Cádiz
Spanish twins
Twin sportspeople
Spanish footballers
Footballers from Andalusia
Association football defenders
La Liga players
Segunda División players
Segunda División B players
Betis Deportivo Balompié footballers
Real Betis players
Polideportivo Ejido footballers
CD Tenerife players
CF Reus Deportiu players
CD Mirandés footballers
Belgian Pro League players
K.A.A. Gent players
Moldovan Super Liga players
FC Sheriff Tiraspol players
Super League Greece players
Ergotelis F.C. players
Azerbaijan Premier League players
Simurq PIK players
Neftçi PFK players
Spain youth international footballers
Spain under-21 international footballers
Spanish expatriate footballers
Expatriate footballers in Belgium
Expatriate footballers in Moldova
Expatriate footballers in Greece
Expatriate footballers in Azerbaijan
Spanish expatriate sportspeople in Belgium
Spanish expatriate sportspeople in Moldova
Spanish expatriate sportspeople in Greece
Spanish expatriate sportspeople in Azerbaijan